Part of the Uncompahgre Project located on the western slope of central Colorado, the Taylor Park Dam was engineered by the Bureau of Reclamation. It is located on the Taylor River, a tributary of the Gunnison River, and the dam is used to create the Taylor Park Reservoir in Gunnison County, Colorado.

Taylor Park Reservoir
The Taylor Park Reservoir is a body of water created by the 1937 Taylor Park Dam, which dams the Taylor River of Colorado, United States. The dam and reservoir, located about 35 miles northeast of Gunnison, are part of the Uncompahgre Project in Colorado. Recreation management at the reservoir is under the jurisdiction of the U.S. Forest Service and offers camping and fishing. Available fish species in the reservoir include rainbow, brown, and cutthroat trout, mackinaw, kokanee, northern pike, and brook trout in the tributaries. The summit of Cottonwood Pass lies a few miles east of the reservoir and can be accessed via Gunnison County Road 209 during the summer months.

See also
List of largest reservoirs of Colorado

Additional Sources
 Bureau of Reclamation-Taylor Park Dam

External links
U.S. Bureau of Reclamation page
Recreation.gov Link to Taylor Park Reservoir Description and Directions
Taylor Park Reservoir conditions and reports

Dams in Colorado
Buildings and structures in Gunnison County, Colorado
1937 establishments in Colorado
Dams completed in 1937